State Trunk Highway 149 (Highway 149, STH-149 or WIS 149) was a state highway in the U.S. state of Wisconsin. It ran through  of Manitowoc, Calumet, and Fond du Lac counties.

History 

In 1923, WIS 149 ran from WIS 57 (today's WIS 32/WIS 57) in Kiel to WIS 17 (then US 141, now Westview Street east of today's I-43) in St. Wendel (now Cleveland). In 1938, part of the route near Kiel was straightened to follow today's County Trunk Highway XX (CTH-XX). In 1947, WIS 149 was extended westward to US 151/WIS 55 (now just US 151) in Peebles, superseding CTH-U, CTH-I, and a part of CTH-HH. Also, WIS 149 was extended eastward via Westvie Street and Washington Street to present-day CTH-LS just west of the shore of Lake Michigan. In 1979, WIS 149 was removed east of the newly built I-43. As a result, the former connection to Cleveland was downgraded to CTH-XX. By 1987, WIS 149 was shortened even further to end at WIS 32/WIS 57 in Kiel. As a result, CTH-XX extended west to WIS 67 near Kiel.

The road was turned back to local control in 2006. The highway, since then, was designated as multiple county routes. County HH was extended from Marytown to Kiel, Fond du Lac County G took over primary signage on the portion concurrent with the highway (from Marytown to just west of St. Joe), and Fond du Lac County created County WH for the remainder.

Major intersections 
This junction list shows the pre-1987 routing.

See also

References

External links

149
Transportation in Fond du Lac County, Wisconsin
Transportation in Manitowoc County, Wisconsin